Rejoice in the Suffering is the debut solo album by Queensrÿche vocalist Todd La Torre, released on 5 February 2021 through Rat Pak Records.

Recording
In 2017, La Torre announced that he was working on his first solo album with his friend Craig Blackwell as co-songwriter, while simultaneously recording his third album with Queensrÿche, The Verdict. As global touring came to a halt due to the COVID-19 pandemic, La Torre used his downtime from Queensrÿche to put the finishing touches on Rejoice in The Suffering. As was the case on Queensrÿche's The Verdict, La Torre also played drums; Blackwell played guitar, bass, and keyboards.  La Torre and Blackwell self-produced the album, however, they called on Queensrÿche producer Zeuss to oversee mixing and mastering. The album also features guest appearances from Jordan Ziff, who plays the second half of the guitar solo on the title track “Rejoice in the Suffering”, and Al Nunn who plays keyboard on “One by One”.

Critical reception

Sonic Perspectives contributor Jonathan Smith rated the album 9.5 out of 10, writing, "Drawing from a highly diverser well of influences, it's tempting to file this sonic venture under the genre tag 'various,' but the best way to truly understand the game of notes at play here would be a modernized take on traditional metal with peripheral variations." Dom Lawson of Blabbermouth.net rated it 7.5 out of 10, writing, "Not every song sinks its talons in with quite the same ferocity, but Rejoice In The Suffering is still an unapologetic, balls-to-the-wind metal record, and a robust reminder that Todd La Torre is a one-man heavy metal whirlwind with one of the great voices of the modern era."

Track listing

Personnel
 Todd La Torre – vocals, drums, production
 Craig Blackwell – guitars, bass guitar, keyboards, production
 Jordan Ziff – guitar solo on "Rejoice in the Suffering"
 Al Nunn – keyboard on "One by One"
 Zeuss – mixing and mastering

References

2021 debut albums